Unknown Pleasures is the debut studio album by English rock band Joy Division, released on 15 June 1979 by Factory Records. The album was recorded and mixed over three successive weekends at Stockport's Strawberry Studios in April 1979, with producer Martin Hannett contributing a number of unconventional recording techniques to the group's sound. The cover artwork was designed by artist Peter Saville, using a data plot of signals from a radio pulsar. It is the only Joy Division album released during lead singer Ian Curtis's lifetime.

Factory Records did not release any singles from Unknown Pleasures, and the album did not chart despite the relative success of the group's non-album debut single "Transmission". It has since received sustained critical acclaim as an influential post-punk album, and has been named as one of the best albums of all time by publications such as NME, AllMusic, Select, Rolling Stone, and Spin.

Background 
Joy Division formed in Salford in 1976 during the first wave of punk rock. Bernard Sumner and Peter Hook had separately attended a Sex Pistols show at the Manchester Lesser Free Trade Hall on 4 June 1976 and both embraced that band's simplicity, speed and aggression. Forming a band with their friend Terry Mason on drums, Sumner on guitar and Hook on bass, they advertised for a singer. Ian Curtis, whom Sumner and Hook already knew, applied and, without having to audition, was taken on. After a number of changes of drummer, Stephen Morris joined the band—at that time called Warsaw—in August 1977. To avoid confusion with the London punk band Warsaw Pakt, they renamed themselves Joy Division in late 1977.

After signing a recording contract with RCA Records in early 1978, Joy Division recorded some demos; however, they were unhappy with the way their music was mixed and asked to be released from their contract. The band's first release was the self-produced extended play (EP), An Ideal for Living, which was released in June 1978. They made their television debut on Tony Wilson's local news show Granada Reports in September 1978. According to Hook, the band received a £70,000 offer from Genetic Records in London. However, the band's manager, Rob Gretton, approached Wilson about releasing an album on his Factory Records label. Wilson explained that Gretton had calculated that given Factory's 50/50 split of profits, the band could make as much money with the indie label as it could by signing to a major. Wilson added that one of Gretton's main reasons for approaching Factory was so "he wouldn't have to get on a train to London every week and 'talk to nuggets'. No one could use the word 'cockney' with as much contempt as Rob". Gretton estimated that the album would cost £8,000 to produce; however, Wilson said in 2006 that the up-front cost ended at £18,000.

Recording 
Unknown Pleasures was recorded at Strawberry Studios in Stockport over three weekends between 1 and 17 April 1979, with Martin Hannett producing. Hannett, who believed that punk rock was sonically conservative because of its refusal to use studio technology to create sonic space, used a number of unusual production techniques and sound effects on the album, including several AMS 15-80s digital delays, the Marshall Time Modulator, tape echo and bounce, as well as the sound of a bottle smashing, someone eating crisps, backwards guitar and the sound of the Strawberry Studios lift with a Leslie speaker "whirring inside". He also used the sound of a basement toilet. Hannett recorded Curtis's vocals for "Insight" down a telephone line so he could achieve the "requisite distance". Hannett later said, "[Joy Division] were a gift to a producer, because they didn't have a clue. They didn't argue". Referring to the recording sessions, Hook remembered, "Sumner started using a kit-built Powertran Transcendent 2000 synthesiser, most notably on 'I Remember Nothing', where it vied with the sound of Rob Gretton smashing bottles with Steve and his Walther replica pistol." During the recording, Morris invested in a syndrum because he thought he saw one on the cover of Can's 1971 album Tago Mago.

AllMusic wrote that Hannett's production on Unknown Pleasures was "as much a hallmark as the music itself," describing it as "emphasizing space in the most revelatory way since the dawn of dub." Describing Hannett's production techniques, Hook said, "[He] didn't think straight, he thought sideways. He confused you and made you do something you didn't expect." Hook went on to say, "Derek Bramwood of Strawberry Studios said that you can take a group that have got on brilliantly for 20 years, put them in a studio with Martin and within five minutes, they'll be trying to slash each other's throats." However, Hook went on to say that Hannett was only as good as the material he had to work with, "We gave him great songs, and like a top chef, he added some salt and pepper and some herbs and served up the dish. But he needed our ingredients." The band members' opinions differed on the "spacious, atmospheric sound" of the album, which did not reflect their more aggressive live sound. Sumner said, "The music was loud and heavy, and we felt that Martin had toned it down, especially with the guitars. The production inflicted this dark, doomy mood over the album: we'd drawn this picture in black and white, and Martin had coloured it in for us. We resented it ..." Hook said, "I couldn't hide my disappointment then, it sounded like Pink Floyd."

Morris disagreed, saying, "I was happy with Unknown Pleasures. My theory on things at the time was that the two things—listening to a record and going to a gig—were quite different. You don't want to hear a record when you go to a gig: you want something with a bit of energy." Curtis was also happy with the production of the album and was impressed with Hannett's work. Hook conceded in 2006, "It definitely didn't turn out sounding the way I wanted it ... But now I can see that Martin did a good job on it ... There's no two ways about it, Martin Hannett created the Joy Division sound." Hook also noted that he was able to hear Curtis's lyrics and Sumner's guitar parts for the first time on the record, because during gigs the band played too loudly.

Artwork and packaging 
Peter Saville, who had previously designed posters for Manchester's Factory club in 1978, designed the cover of the album. Sumner or Morris, depending on the account, chose the image used on the cover, which is based on an image of radio waves from pulsar CP 1919, from The Cambridge Encyclopaedia of Astronomy. Saville reversed the image from black-on-white to white-on-black, against the band's stated preference for the original. "I was afraid it might look a little cheap. I was convinced that it was just sexier in black" since it represented a signal from space. He printed it on textured card for the original version of the album.

It is not a Fourier analysis as sometimes stated, but rather an image of the intensity of successive radio pulses, as stated in the Cambridge Encyclopaedia. In simple terms, the image is a "stacked plot" of the radio emissions given out by a pulsar, a "rotating neutron star". Originally named CP 1919, the pulsar was discovered in November 1967 by student Jocelyn Bell Burnell and her supervisor Antony Hewish at Cambridge University. As the star turns, it emits electromagnetic radiation in a beam like a lighthouse, which can be picked up by radio telescopes. Each line on the image is an individual pulse. They are not exactly the same each time as the long distance the beam travels introduces interference.

The image was originally created by radio astronomer Harold Craft at the Arecibo Observatory for his 1970 doctoral dissertation as a way to visualize smaller pulses within larger ones, which might help explain what had been causing the pulses. He was unaware for years that the image was associated with the album cover until a friend told him; afterwards he bought a copy because he felt he should have one as the creator of the image.

Susie Goldring, reviewing the album for BBC Online said, "The duochrome Peter Saville cover of this first Joy Division album speaks volumes. Its white on black lines reflect a pulse of power, a surge of bass, and raw angst. If the cover doesn't draw you in, the music will."

Iconic status

The cover image became strongly associated with the band's fans at goth gatherings later in the '80s, after Joy Division's surviving members had become New Order. In the 21st century, it started to become an iconic image outside Joy Division fandom. Raf Simons collaborated with Saville on a 2003 clothing line that used the plot; three years later Supreme followed suit. The cover of Vince Staples' 2015 album Summertime '06 is based on the Unknown Pleasures image.

In 2012 the Disney corporation used the cover image for a t-shirt with Mickey Mouse, which was taken as a joke but not meant as one. Saville explains the image's adaptability as a result of it being "cool, in all of the meanings, from cool to cold".

Inner sleeve

The inner sleeve features a black-and-white photograph of a door with a hand near the handle. It was some years later before Saville discovered that the photograph was Hand Through a Doorway, a well-known picture by Ralph Gibson.

Release 
Unknown Pleasures was initially printed in a run of 10,000 copies, with 5,000 copies being sold within the first two weeks of release, and a further 10,000 copies being sold over the following six months. Initially, sales of Unknown Pleasures were slow until the release of the non-album single, "Transmission", and unsold copies occupied the Factory Records office in the flat of label co-founder Alan Erasmus.

Following the release of "Transmission", Unknown Pleasures sold out of its initial pressing, with this prompting further pressings. Unknown Pleasures created approximately £50,000 in profit, to be shared between Factory Records and the band; however, Tony Wilson spent most of these profits on Factory projects. By the conclusion of a critically acclaimed promotional tour supporting Buzzcocks in November 1979, Unknown Pleasures had neared 15,000 copies sold.

Unknown Pleasures failed to chart on the UK Albums Chart. However, following Curtis's suicide in May 1980 and the release of their second album, Closer, in July, it was reissued and reached No. 71 at the end of that August. It fared better on the UK Indie Chart, placing at No. 2 on the first chart to be published in January 1980 and going on to top the chart following its reissue, spending 136 weeks on the chart in total. The 40th-anniversary reissue of the album charted at number 5 in the UK Albums Chart when it was released in 2019, making Unknown Pleasures Joy Division's highest-charting album.

In 2007, remastered versions of both Unknown Pleasures and the posthumous studio album Closer—plus the 1981 compilation album Still—were re-released, with the remastered version of Unknown Pleasures including a bonus disc of a live recording of the band playing at The Factory in Manchester on 13 July 1979. The album was also re-released on 180-gram vinyl with the original track listing in 2007, with this version also being available in a limited edition box set with Closer and Still. The album was reissued again on limited edition 180g ruby red coloured vinyl with an alternative white sleeve, released on 7 May 2019, to coincide with the album's 40th anniversary.

Critical reception

Initial response 
Melody Maker called Unknown Pleasures an "opaque manifesto" and musically described it as "Gary Glitter meets the Velvet Underground". Reviewer Jon Savage declared "[leaving] the twentieth century is difficult; most people prefer to go back and nostalgise, Oh boy. Joy Division at least set a course in the present with contrails for the future—perhaps you can't ask for much more. Indeed, Unknown Pleasures may very well be one of the best, white, English, debut LPs of the year." Max Bell of NME qualified the record as "extraordinary," writing that "without trying to baffle or overreach itself, this outfit step into a labyrinth that is rarely explored with any smidgeon of real conviction." He compared it favourably to the work of Strange Days-era Doors and "German experimentalists" such as Can and Neu!. In Rolling Stone, music journalist Mikal Gilmore described the album as having "a doleful, deep-toned sound that often suggested an elaborate version of the Velvet Underground or an orderly Public Image Ltd." By August of that year the album's stature as a favourite of critics for the year was established. Robert Palmer placed the album at fourth place in his best of 1980 list for The New York Times, proclaiming the album as an "exceptional debut" and that the album "remains the group's masterpiece" and that it was "some of the most driven, desperate rock-and-roll ever recorded."

Other writers were less enthusiastic. Red Starr, writing for Smash Hits, gave the album a generally positive review, describing it as a "bleak nightmare soundtrack". Starr described the lyrics as "mysterious" and "doomy" which were "amidst intense music of urgent guitar, eerie effects and driving rhythms". However, Starr tempered his review by saying not to "expect too much" as the album was "still pretty raw". Writing about Factory for Melody Maker in September 1979, Mary Harron was less impressed: "I found at least half of [Unknown Pleasures] to be turgid and monotonous, and the vocals heavy and melodramatic—Jim Morrison without flair." She went on to say the lyrics and the atmosphere of the album "seemed to hearken back to the late Sixties" and the songs were "a series of disconnected images".

Legacy 

Retrospective critical writing on the album has been virtually unanimous in its praise. In 1994, Jon Savage described the music as "a definitive Northern Gothic statement: guilt-ridden, romantic, claustrophobic". Analysing Curtis's work, music journalist Richard Cook remarked in 1983: "sex has disappeared from these unknown pleasures; it is an aftermath of passion where everything's (perhaps) lost". Stuart Maconie of Select deemed Unknown Pleasures "music without a past or a future but with the muscularity of all great rock" and "one of the greatest first albums ever."

Ned Raggett, reviewing the album for AllMusic, described Unknown Pleasures as "All visceral, all emotional, all theatrical, all perfect—one of the best albums ever." Robert Christgau said that it was Curtis's "passionate gravity that makes the clumsy, disquieting music so convincing". Colin Larkin called the music "distinctive and disturbing" in his Encyclopedia of Popular Music (2011), while highlighting "She's Lost Control", where Curtis was "at his most manically arresting". In relation to the remastered re-released album in 2007, the British music magazine NME described the album as "simply one of the best records ever made, and is still powerful enough to floor you 28 years on".

In 2000 it was voted number 249 in Colin Larkin's All Time Top 1000 Albums. The album was also included in the book 1001 Albums You Must Hear Before You Die.

Peter Hook and The Light have played the Unknown Pleasures album in its entirety on several of their concert tours, and have recorded and released live albums of some of their gigs. Hook also named one of his books Unknown Pleasures: Inside Joy Division in 2012.

Accolades

(*) designates unordered lists.

Track listing

Personnel 
Credits adapted from AllMusic:

Joy Division
Ian Curtis – vocals
Bernard Sumner – guitar, keyboards
Peter Hook – bass guitar, vocals on "Interzone"
Stephen Morris – drums, percussion

Production
Martin Hannett – producer
Chris Nagle – engineer
Peter Saville – design
Chris Mathan – design

Charts

Weekly charts

Year-end charts

Certifications

See also

1979 in music
List of punk rock albums
List of Internet phenomena

References

Further reading

Sources

External links 
 Complete lyrics for Unknown Pleasures

1979 debut albums
Albums produced by Martin Hannett
Factory Records albums
Joy Division albums
Albums recorded at Strawberry Studios